Andrew Allan may refer to:

 Andrew Allan (radio executive) (1907–1974), national head of CBC Radio Drama
 Andrew Allan (artist) (1863–1942), British lithographic artist
 Andrew Allan (shipowner) (1822–1901), Scottish-born Canadian businessman and financier
Andy Allan (1869–1916), Australian rules footballer

See also 
 Andrew Allen (disambiguation)